John Michael Boardman (13 February 193818 March 2021) was a mathematician whose speciality was algebraic and differential topology. He was affiliated with the  University of Cambridge, England and the Johns Hopkins University in Baltimore, Maryland. Boardman was most widely known for his construction of the first rigorously correct model of the homotopy category of spectra.

He received his PhD from the University of Cambridge in 1964. His thesis advisor was C. T. C. Wall. In 2012 he became a fellow of the American Mathematical Society. He died on 18 March 2021.

Selected publications

References

Further reading

External links

Alumni of the University of Cambridge
20th-century American mathematicians
21st-century American mathematicians
20th-century British mathematicians
21st-century British mathematicians
Johns Hopkins University faculty
Fellows of the American Mathematical Society
2021 deaths
Topologists
1938 births